Apona fuliginosa is a moth in the family Eupterotidae. It was described by Yasunori Kishida in 1993. It is found in Taiwan.

The wingspan is 54 mm for males and 67 mm for females. The forewings are greyish fuscous, with the median and subterminal areas pale greyish. The hindwings are greyish ocher, with five inconspicuous transverse lines.

References

Moths described in 1993
Eupterotinae